Kesoram Industries Limited is one of the pioneer companies in India. It is under the flagship 'B K Birla Group Of Companies'. Its production ranges from tires to cement to rayon. According to ET500, its all India ranking was 121 for the year 2010 with a net income of Rs. 5020.63 Crore and a net profit of Rs. 648.29 Crore. In 2011, Kesoram Industries installed a small stationary packing unit. Kesoram Industries entered into a joint venture with Maharashtra Seamless Limited and Dhariwal Infrastructure Private Limited in 2012 for working a coal block allocated to it by the Central Government in the State of Maharashtra. Under the cement division of Kesoram Industries Limited, Birla Shakti manufactures and sells cement. Birla Shakti has two cement manufacturing plants located in Basantnagar, Telangana (the "Kesoram Cement Plant") and Sedam, Karnataka (the "Vasavadatta Cement Plant"). The company reported a net profit of Rs. 339.67 crore during the quarter of 2014–15 by selling a tyre plant to JK Tyres.

History 
Kesoram Industries Limited started its business with Kesoram Cotton Mills Ltd. in 1919. After the partnership began, production of rayon emerged. The first rayon plant was built in 1959 under the name Kesoram Rayon, https://kesoramrayon.in/. Shortly after the plant was built, the business started the production of tires and cement under the brand name Birla Tyres and Birla Shakti Cement respectively. To take advantage of favourable market conditions, in 1986 another cement plant, known as Vasavadatta Cement, was commissioned by it at Sedam, Dist. Gulbarga (Karnataka). Again the name of the company was changed to Kesoram Industries Limited. on 9 July of the year 1986. Since then, Kesoram Industries Limited has grown stronger. It has listings on four global stock exchanges: National Stock Exchange of India, Bombay Stock Exchange, Calcutta Stock Exchange Association, and the Societe de la Bourse de Luxembourg.

Business 
Currently, Kesoram Industries Limited has three major divisions:

1) Birla Tyres – Birla Tyres was first established in 1991, as part of Kesoram Industries Limited. It then collaborated with tyre manufacturer Pirelli, in the production and development of its tires. Birla Tyres

2) Birla Shakti Cement – Under the cement division of Kesoram Industries Limited, Birla Shakti manufactures and sells cement. Birla Shakti has two cement manufacturing plants located in Sedam, Karnataka (the "Vasavadatta Cement Plant") and Basantnagar, Telangana   (the "Kesoram Cement Plant"). 

3) Kesoram Rayon https://kesoramrayon.in/ – It was established in 1959. Situated in the banks of the Ganges, Kesoram Rayon is a viscose rayon filament yarn and cellophane paper manufacturing unit with over 2700 employees. The factory currently has 52 spinning machines with an installed capacity of 6500 MT per annum. It is the only company in Eastern India to manufacture Viscose Filament Rayon Yarn and Cellophane paper.

Kesoram Industries is planning to expand its cement capacity spread over Karnataka and Telangana catering to the markets of South and West. Kesoram now plans to acquire up to 700 acres of land at Gulbarga where its limestone mines are located It would also take a call on whether it needs to put in manufacturing plants like grinding units there.

Note: Shri Basant Kumar Birla (erstwhile Chairman of Kesoram Industries Ltd.) died on 3 July 2019

References 

Cement companies of India
Manufacturing companies based in Kolkata
Indian brands
Tyre manufacturers of India
Indian companies established in 1919
Manufacturing companies established in 1919